The Hughes Medal is awarded by the Royal Society of London "in recognition of an original discovery in the physical sciences, particularly electricity and magnetism or their applications". Named after David E. Hughes, the medal is awarded with a gift of £1000. The medal was first awarded in 1902 to J. J. Thomson "for his numerous contributions to electric science, especially in reference to the phenomena of electric discharge in gases", and has since been awarded over one-hundred times.  Unlike other Royal Society medals, the Hughes Medal has never been awarded to the same individual more than once.

The medal has on occasion been awarded to multiple people at a time; in 1938 it was won by John Cockcroft and Ernest Walton "for their discovery that nuclei could be disintegrated by artificially produced bombarding particles", in 1981 by Peter Higgs and Tom Kibble "for their international contributions about the spontaneous breaking of fundamental symmetries in elementary-particle theory", in 1982 by Drummond Matthews and Frederick Vine "for their elucidation of the magnetic properties of the ocean floors which subsequently led to the plate tectonic hypothesis" and in 1988 by Archibald Howie and M. J. Whelan "for their contributions to the theory of electron diffraction and microscopy, and its application to the study of lattice defects in crystals".

List of recipients 
Source: Royal Society

Note. As of 2011, the Hughes Medal has been awarded biennially (on odd years).

See also

 List of physics awards

References 
General

Specific

External links 
Royal Society: Hughes Medal

Physics awards
Awards established in 1902
1902 establishments in the United Kingdom
Awards of the Royal Society
1902 in science